James Higgins (1874 – after 1899) was an English professional footballer who played in the Football League for Small Heath. Born in Cradley Heath, Staffordshire, Higgins played local football for Stourbridge before joining Small Heath in 1897. A centre forward, he made his debut in the Second Division on 2 April 1898 in a 2–1 win at Luton Town. He kept his place for the remaining five games of the 1897–98 season, and scored three goals, but when the club signed Bob McRoberts he decided his future lay back in non-league football.

References

1874 births
Year of death missing
People from Cradley Heath
English footballers
Association football forwards
Stourbridge F.C. players
Birmingham City F.C. players
Halesowen Town F.C. players
English Football League players
Place of death missing